The expression "...the creek don't rise" is an American slang expression implying strong intentions subject to complete frustration by uncommon but not unforeseeable events.  It presumably evokes occasional and unpredictably extreme rainfall in Appalachia, that has historically isolated one rural neighborhood or another temporarily inaccessible on several or many occasions. It is sometimes thought that the word "Creek" instead refers to the Creek Indians, but this is unlikely.

Classic versions of its use tend to be along the lines of "The good Lord willing, and the creek doesn't rise"—i.e. "If God so wills, and as long as intense rain does not wash away bridges or parts of dirt roads, or cover roads too deeply for safely following them." It may take the form of real or mock dialect, in variations like "... Lor' willin' an' th' crick don' rise."

See also
 Spike Lee's documentary series If God Is Willing and Da Creek Don't Rise
 Jerry Reed's song "If the Good Lord's Willing and the Creek Don't Rise", covered by Johnny Cash
 Ray LaMontagne's album God Willin' & the Creek Don't Rise
 "Good Lord's Willin and The Creek Don't Rise", covered by Hank Williams Sr
 Native Invader by Tori Amos
 Inshallah, a similar phrase in Arabic

References

American English idioms
Appalachian culture
Culture of the Southern United States